Attorney General Parker may refer to:

Alban J. Parker (1893–1971), Attorney General of Vermont
Clifton G. Parker (1906–1988), Attorney General of Vermont
David Parker (New Zealand politician) (born 1960), Attorney-General of New Zealand
George P. Parker (1885–1937),  Attorney General of Utah
Herbert Parker (Massachusetts politician) (1856–1939), Attorney General of Massachusetts
Jay S. Parker (1895–1969), Attorney General of Kansas 
Joel Parker (politician) (1816–1888), Attorney General of New Jersey
Robert Parker (judge) (1796–1865), Attorney General of New Brunswick

See also
General Parker (disambiguation)